Andre Neil Compton (born 15 May 1977 in Dewsbury, England) is a  former speedway rider from England. He is the older brother of Benji Compton.

Career summary
In 2004, Compton's form led to a call-up from Elite League side Poole Pirates. This was also the year in which Compton became Premier League Riders Champion. He passed the unbeaten Simon Stead in the final, and both riders fell on the last turn, giving both riders multiple injuries. The race was awarded and Compton managed to take his place on the rostrum as winner.

In 2006, Compton became the captain of the Sheffield Tigers following the retirement of Sean Wilson. It was a successful season for the Tigers who finished second in the Premier League and gained a place in the Premier League play-off final, which was won by the King's Lynn Stars. Compton tore ligaments in his shoulder while riding in Sweden in August, just before the Premier Trophy Final, which they consequently lost to King's Lynn Stars.

He recovered in time to compete in the Premier League Riders' Championship in September, but fell heavily while in the tournament in his fourth heat. He soon returned to action but was unable to prevent his team from losing the play-off final to King's Lynn and again becoming runners up in the Premier League.

In 2007 and 2008, Compton remained with the Sheffield Tigers. At the end of the 2008 season, Compton announced his retirement from the sport to pursue other business matters, stating that he had lost his passion for speedway.  A subsequent change of heart saw him return to the Premier League, moving to the Workington Comets after six consecutive seasons with Sheffield Tigers.On 16 June 2013 it was announced at the Red revolution open at Glasgow that Compton had signed a contract to ride for the Glasgow Tigers for the rest of the season.

After the 2015 season with Sheffield he retired permanently.

References 

1977 births
Living people
British speedway riders
Sportspeople from Dewsbury
Newcastle Diamonds riders
Sheffield Tigers riders
Stoke Potters riders
Hull Vikings riders
Belle Vue Aces riders
Coventry Bees riders
Berwick Bandits riders
Peterborough Panthers riders
Poole Pirates riders
Reading Racers riders
Bradford Dukes riders
Workington Comets riders